Francesco Londonio (Milan, 1723 – Milan, 1783) was an Italian painter, engraver, and scenographer, active mainly in Milan in a late-Baroque or Rococo style.

Londonio trained as a painter under Ferdinando Porta and Giovanni Battista Sassi in Milan, but traveled to Rome and Naples. He studied engraving with Benigno Bossi. He is best known for his paintings and etchings of rustic and pastoral landscapes and subjects, with both animals and peasants playing a dominating role over the landscape. This focus on genre themes was popular among the wealthy patrons of the time, specially in Northern Italy; and artists such as the Brescian painters Ceruti and Cifrondi worked with such themes. In his engravings, he recalls Gaetano Zompini.

Londonio is also known for his scenography. An example, of this poorly conserved art form that still exists is a nativity scene on cut wooden shapes for the church of San Marco in Milan. The effect is a cheaper version of the naturalistic Sacri Monti scenes, which had been painted stucco statuary. It also can be seen as a cross between the holy scenes described above, and the theatrical set pieces, for example, those needed for the newly founded La Scala theater. The work at San Marco prompted Empress Maria Theresa of Austria appointed Londonio as art designer for La Scala.

Sources
  Il costume antico e moderno di tutti il populi. Dottor Giulio Ferrario, edizione secunda, Vincenzo Batelli, 1832, volume ottavo parte terza, Florence
  Enciclopedia metodica critico-ragionata delle belle arti . Part 1, Volume 12, Abate Don Pietro Zani, 1822, Parma, Tipografia Ducale.
  Art in Northern Italy (1911) by Corrado Ricci, Editor: Charles Scribner's Sons, page 184. 
   Entry for Londonio at commercial site

Bibliography
  L. Böhm, ″Pittori milanesi del Settecento: Francesco Londonio″, in Rivista d'Arte, XVI, 3, 1934, pp. 229–261. 
  M. Scola, Catalogo ragionato delle incisioni di Francesco Londonio, Milano 1994 
  M. Bona Castellotti, C. Geddo, Francesco Londonio (1723-1783), exhibition catalogue, Galleria Piva, Milano, 1998.
  S. Coppa, C. Geddo, Tra Arcadia e Illuminismo in Lombardia: la raccolta di studi di Francesco Londonio, exhibition catalogue, Pinacoteca di Brera, Milano 2002 (Brera mai vista, 4) . 
  C. Geddo, Londonio, Francesco, in Dizionario Biografico degli Italiani, vol. LXV, Roma 2005, pp. 610–613

External links 
Works by francesco Londonio at the Museum of New Zealand Te Papa Tongarewa
Works by Francesco Londonio at the Fine Arts Museums of San Francisco

Gallery

1723 births
1783 deaths
Artists from Milan
18th-century Italian painters
Italian male painters
Italian scenic designers
Italian painters of animals
Italian Baroque painters
Italian genre painters
Theatre people from Milan
18th-century Italian male artists